Pierre Athanase Chauvin was a French painter active in Italy.

Chauvin was a student of the landscape painter Pierre-Henri de Valenciennes. He began his career at the Paris Salon in 1793 and won the First Class Medal in 1819 with his painting Charles VIII’s entry into Acquapendente. The painting was commissioned by Louis XVIII of France for the Galerie de Diane at the Palace of Fontainebleau.

In 1813, Chauvin settled in Rome and became a member of the Accademia di San Luca. Chauvin’s views of Italy show the influence of Jean Auguste Dominique Ingres in their both classical and realist style. Chauvin knew Ingres and the latter painted portraits of Chauvin and his wife in 1814.

Chauvin was elected Chevalier of the Legion of Honor in 1828.

His work was represented in the exhibition An Enchanted Country. Italy depicted by Artists from Thomas Jones to Corot at the Centro Internazionale d’Arte e di Cultura di Palazzo Te in Mantua, Italy in 2001.

References

 An Enchanted Country. Italy depicted by Artists from Thomas Jones to Corot Exhibition Catalogue, Ottarri Cavina, Anna, Electa, Milan, 2001
De David a Delacroix: La Peinture francaise de 1774 à 1830 Exhibition Catalogue, Paris Grand Palais, 1974, pp 349–351
Grove Dictionary of Art, Lorraine Peake, vol. 6, p. 519

Further reading

18th-century French painters
French male painters
19th-century French painters
Chevaliers of the Légion d'honneur
1774 births
1832 deaths
Painters from Paris
19th-century French male artists
18th-century French male artists